Amatorski is a Belgian post-rock band consisting of Inne Eysermans, Sebastiaan Van den Branden and Christophe Claeys.

History 

Amatorski was formed in 2008. The group became famous after reaching the final at the Humo's Rock Rally in 2010. The band name comes from the Polish word for amateurish, accordingly the group records its music in low fidelity. Apart from that their music is also characterized by a melancholic, blurry style in which the texts are often very narrative. This is expressed in their record  Come home for which singer Inne Eysermans found inspiration by reading the love letters from her grandmother that were written during World War II. This song gained fame since it was used in Belgium during publicity spots for water brand Spa Reine.

In 2011 they travelled to London, England to work with producer Darren Allison (Spiritualized, The Divine Comedy, Belle & Sebastian) on their debut album TBC. Upon its release, TBC garnered much critical acclaim, and ascended to number 5 in the Belgian album chart. Later that year, the album received nominations in several categories, at the Belgian Music Industry Awards.

Their style was often compared to that of Portishead and Sigur Ros.

Entitled from clay to figures, Amatorski's second album is coming out in April 2014, on Crammed Discs (who have also given TBC an international release in 2013).

In 2014, Dominik Scherrer composed a new orchestral version of their song "Come Home", which is used as the opening theme of acclaimed BBC One and Starz drama The Missing.

In December 2020, a cover of the band's song "Come Home" was featured in Toyota's annual Christmas commercial, titled "Mailbox," in partnership with the USO.

Music Industry Awards
In 2010 they were nominated for three Belgian MIAs. However, they did not win any of the prizes:
 Hit of the year (Come Home)
 Best artwork (Same Stars We Shared -artwork done by Femke Vanbelle)
 Best breakthrough

Band members
 Inne Eysermans (singing, piano, guitar, accordion)
 Sebastiaan Van den Branden (singing, guitar)
 Christophe Claeys drums, percussion

Former members
 Hilke Ros (contrabass, synthbass)
 Laurens Van Bouwelen (drums, vibraphone)

Discography

Albums

Singles

References

External links
Official website
Interview with Amatorski at Bedroomdisco

Belgian post-rock groups